The First Unitarian Church of Oakland is located in western Downtown Oakland, California.  It is a member of the Unitarian Universalist Association.

History
The building site was purchased in November 1888 from Jane K. Sather, a patron of the University of California. Construction began in 1890 and was completed in September 1891, although it began to be used for various activities while still unfinished.

The church building was designed in 1889 by Walter J. Mathews. This solid masonry Romanesque Revival style church departed radically from California's then predominant wood framed Carpenter Gothic style churches. It is noted for its famous stained glass windows produced by Goodhue of Boston, and for its arching redwood spans that were the widest at the time west of the Rocky Mountains.

The 1906 San Francisco earthquake damaged the building, but did not destroy it.

Landmark
The church is listed as California Historical Landmark #896, and is also listed on the National Register of Historic Places (NPS-77000284). The church remains a significant cultural and architectural landmark in Oakland.

References

External links 

 Harvard.edu: Historical records of the First Unitarian Church of Oakland — at the Andover-Harvard Theological Library, Harvard Divinity School.

Churches in Oakland, California
Unitarian Universalist churches in California
Churches completed in 1891
California Historical Landmarks
National Register of Historic Places in Oakland, California
Churches on the National Register of Historic Places in California
Historic American Buildings Survey in California
19th century in Oakland, California
1890s architecture in the United States
Romanesque Revival church buildings in California